Fredrik Carlsson (born  in Täby) is a retired Swedish professional ice hockey defenceman.  While still active, he played for AIK of the Swedish Hockey League (SHL) before ending his career due to multiple concussions at the age of 25.

Career statistics

References

External links

Living people
1988 births
AIK IF players
Swedish ice hockey defencemen
People from Täby Municipality
Sportspeople from Stockholm County